Ralph Dalton Cornell (January 11, 1890 – April 6, 1972) was an American landscape architect from Los Angeles, California.

Biography

Early life
Ralph Dalton Cornell was born on January 11, 1890, in Holdrege, Nebraska. He moved to California with his family in 1908. He graduated from Pomona College in 1914 and received an M.L.A. from Harvard University in 1917. During World War I, he served in the United States Army.

Career

In 1919, he established a practice as a landscape architect in Los Angeles, California. He designed the Torrey Pines State Natural Reserve in La Jolla with Theodore Payne. He also designed the Hillside Memorial Park Cemetery, the grounds of the Civic Center and the La Brea Tar Pits in Los Angeles, the Beverly Gardens Park in Beverly Hills, and the Glen Haven Memorial Park in Sylmar. He also restored the grounds of the Los Cerritos Ranch House in Long Beach.

Additionally, he designed the grounds of Pomona College, the University of California, Los Angeles, and the University of Hawaii.

He was a Fellow of the American Society of Landscape Architects.

Death
He died on April 6, 1972.

References

External links
 

1890 births
1972 deaths
People from Holdrege, Nebraska
People from Los Angeles
Pomona College alumni
American landscape architects
Cornell family
Harvard Graduate School of Design alumni